Matías Franco Descotte and Orlando Luz were the defending champions but chose not to defend their title.

Nicolás Barrientos and Ernesto Escobedo won the title after defeating Christopher Eubanks and Roberto Quiroz 4–6, 6–3, [10–5] in the final.

Seeds

Draw

References

External links
 Main draw

Little Rock Challenger - Doubles
Little Rock Challenger